Peter T. "P.T." Deutermann (born December 27, 1941) is an American writer of mystery, police procedural and thriller novels.

Deutermann served in the United States Navy for 26 years, earning 19 medals and decorations and retiring with the rank of captain.

Biography

Early years
Deutermann was born in Boston, the son of Lieutenant Commander (later Vice Admiral) H. T. Deutermann. The family moved in 1944 to La Jolla, California, where they lived until the end of the war. Between the end of the war and 1959, when Deutermann entered the Naval Academy, the family lived in various places throughout the United States and also in Argentina. Deutermann attended parochial, public, and Jesuit high schools, graduating from Creighton Preparatory in Omaha, Nebraska, in 1959.

Military career
Deutermann was commissioned in 1963 in Annapolis, Maryland into the surface line, where he was ordered to the new destroyer . He served on the Morton for two years, and was on board for the second Gulf of Tonkin Incident in September 1964, which precipitated the first significant aircraft carrier strikes against North Vietnam.

Following his tour on the Morton, he was assigned to class 13 of the destroyer department head school in Newport, Rhode Island. Upon graduation he was diverted from the destroyer forces to Coronado, California, to train in the new Swift class gunboats. Upon completion of training, he went to Manila in the Philippines, as officer in charge of a mobile training team which trained Philippine navy crews to use Swift boats against the pirates plaguing Manila Bay and the waters off Corregidor. From Manila, he went in-country Vietnam as officer in charge of PCF-39, based at the mouth of the main Mekong River channel that led to Saigon.

College and return to the military
In 1968 Deutermann entered the University of Washington for two years, where he was awarded a master's degree in public administration and international law. He rejoined the Pacific Fleet in 1970 as operations officer of the USS Jouett. A month later, the ship went back to Vietnam, serving as the overall air warfare commander in the Gulf of Tonkin and also as a recovery ship for downed Navy and Air Force pilots. During this deployment the ship visited Japan, Hong Kong, Australia and the Philippines. In 1972 Deutermann entered the Naval War College in Newport, Rhode Island, for one year. He was then assigned to The Pentagon for three years, serving on a joint command and control computer integration project.

Return from shore duty
Following shore duty, Deutermann returned to sea, this time in the Atlantic Fleet as executive officer of the guided missile destroyer , which made two deployments to the Mediterranean over the following two years. He returned to the Pentagon in 1978 as a staff officer in the politico-military policy division of the Navy headquarters staff. He published his first book in 1980, a handbook for navy operations officers, through the Naval Institute Press in Annapolis, Maryland.

First command
In 1981 Deutermann assumed command of the guided missile destroyer  for a three-year tour of duty, which included combat operations off Lebanon. Following that assignment he was appointed the executive secretary to the Chief of Naval Operations for JCS matters in Washington, D.C. In late 1985, he assumed command of Destroyer Squadron 25, based in Pearl Harbor, Hawaii, for two years, during which he made one deployment to the Indian Ocean, where he visited Kenya, Pakistan, Singapore and Japan.

Upon conclusion of this tour Deutermann was assigned to the Royal College of Defence Studies (RCDS) in London, England, for one year. It was an international course studying the influence of military affairs on geopolitics, whose members represented forty different nations. In 1988 he returned to the Pentagon as head of the Strategy Planning branch of the Navy staff. He was then assigned as division director of the arms-control negotiations office concerned with chemical, biological, and radiation weapons on the Joint Chiefs of Staff. He was also appointed as a technical delegate to the United Nations, and participated in arms control negotiations with the Soviet Union in Geneva.

Retirement
Deutermann served for 26 years in the Navy, retiring in 1989. He earned 19 military awards and decorations. He then worked successively for three companies between 1989 and 1993, which supported the FAA in the procurement of large-scale computer systems.

Career as an author
After retiring from active duty, Deutermann moved to Georgia to work on his writing career. He published his first novel, entitled Scorpion in the Sea, in 1992 through the George Mason University Press. The book landed him an agent, and then a contract with St. Martin's Press in 1993. Three of his later books have been optioned for feature film development. Nightwalkers, was published May 26, 2009.
In 2012, he was named the recipient of the W.Y. Boyd Literary Award for Excellence in Military Fiction by the American Library Association for his novel Pacific Glory.

Other ventures
Since the late 1990s, Deutermann has served on the board of directors for two high-tech companies and on the board of advisors of the SpaceVest Venture Capital Group in Washington, D.C.

Personal life
Deutermann married Susan Cornelia Degenhardt, of Gainesville, Florida in 1968. They presently live in Rockingham County, North Carolina, where they run a Dartmoor pony breeding farm. Their son Daniel retired after 20 years active duty in both the Navy and the Coast Guard. Daniel's previous assignments included being a flight instructor in Pensacola, Florida. Their daughter, Sarah, flew in Navy F-14 fighter jets, as a radar intercept officer (RIO). She is now an attorney in Greensboro, North Carolina. Deutermann's father, two of his uncles, as well as both of his brothers served in the armed forces, as have some of their children. There has been a Deutermann on active military duty continuously since 1920.

Deutermann's hobbies include the design and construction of formal gardens, reading American Civil War history, and the study of the 1st century Roman Near East.

Bibliography

The Ops Officers Manual (1980) 
Scorpion in the Sea (1992)  
Edge of Honor (1994) 
Official Privilege (1995) 
Sweepers (1997) 
Zero Option (1999) 
Train Man (1999) 
Hunting Season (2001) 
Darkside (2002) 
The Firefly (2003) 
The Cat Dancers (2005) 
Spider Mountain (2006) 
The Moonpool (2008) 
Nightwalkers (2009) 
Pacific Glory (2011) 
The Last Man (2012) 
Ghosts of Bungo Suido (2013) 
Sentinels of Fire (2014) 
Cold Frame (2015) 
The Commodore (2016) 
Red Swan (2017) 
The Iceman (2018) 
The Nugget (2019) 
The Hooligans (2020) 
Trial by Fire (2021) ISBN 9781250273048
The Last Paladin (2022) ISBN 9781250279866

See also
List of Bostonians
List of crime writers
List of mystery writers
List of thriller writers
List of United States Navy people
List of University of Washington people

References

External links
Official website
P. T. Deutermann Papers, 1991-2002, MS 548 held by Special Collections & Archives, Nimitz Library at the United States Naval Academy

1941 births
Living people
Writers from Boston
United States Naval Academy alumni
Evans School of Public Policy and Governance alumni
American military writers
American thriller writers
Graduates of the Royal College of Defence Studies
United States Navy officers
American male novelists
Novelists from Massachusetts
American male non-fiction writers